Ytterbyn is a village in Kalix Municipality in the county of Norrbotten in Sweden. It forms part of the locality Nyborg.

Populated places in Kalix Municipality
Norrbotten